The , officially the , is a straddle-beam, Alweg-type monorail line in Tokyo, Japan. It is an airport rail link that connects Tokyo International Airport (Haneda) to Tokyo's Ōta, Shinagawa, and Minato wards. The  line serves 11 stations between the Monorail Hamamatsuchō and Haneda Airport Terminal 2 stations. It runs on a predominantly elevated north–south route that follows the western coast of Tokyo Bay. The monorail is operated by the Tokyo Monorail Co., Ltd., which is jointly owned by JR East, the system's rolling stock supplier Hitachi, and ANA Holdings, Inc. (the holding company of All Nippon Airways). It carried an average of 140,173 passengers per day in 2018.

Plans to build Japan's first airport rail link surfaced in 1959 as Tokyo was preparing to host the 1964 Summer Olympics. That year, the Yamato Kanko Co., Ltd.—later renamed the Tokyo Monorail Co.—was established to build the rail connection. Construction began in 1963 and completed on 17 September 1964, just 23 days ahead of the Olympic opening ceremony. Upon opening, the monorail operated between the Hamamatsuchō and Haneda stations, making no intermediate stops. It has since been expanded with infill stations and extensions, and there are plans to extend it to Tokyo Station in the future.

The Tokyo Monorail is one of two rail lines serving the airport, the other being the Keikyū Airport Line. At Hamamatsuchō Station, passengers may transfer to the Keihin–Tōhoku and Yamanote lines of JR East, as well as the Asakusa and Oedo lines of the Toei Subway via nearby Daimon Station. The monorail also connects with Tokyo Waterfront Area Rapid Transit's Rinkai Line at Tennōzu Isle Station.

Early history

Tokyo's Haneda Airport had emerged as the country's international gateway by the time Japan's commercial aviation industry recovered from the Second World War in the early 1950s. In 1959, the airport recorded approximately 910,000 total passengers and expected many more for the coming 1964 Summer Olympics. That same year, the government unveiled a plan for a central Tokyo-to-airport rail link. Opponents of the rail line briefly countered with a proposal to extend the Tokyo Expressway instead, but fears that this would only worsen vehicular congestion led to a preference for rail.

In August 1959, the Yamato Kanko Co., Ltd. was established to build the rail line; it renamed to Japan Elevated Railway Co., Ltd. a year later. The company applied for a route license to build a straddle-beam, Alweg-type monorail in January 1960, which the Japanese government granted the following December. The company selected Alweg due to two factors. First, the company's president, Tetsuzo Inumaru, was an old friend of Dr. Axel Wenner-Gren, the founder of Alweg. Second, Hitachi, which would build the line, was keen on further developing the technology.

Project planners originally intended the monorail line to extend from Haneda Airport to Shimbashi or Tokyo Station, and the license that had been acquired allowed building it up to either station. However, opposition from residents living near the Shibaura Canal, which had been part of the proposed route, as well as cost overruns during the construction of the Tōkaidō Shinkansen, which drained government subsidies, resulted in a shortened route from the airport to Hamamatsuchō Station. To further minimize costs, the line was routed over other public waterways donated by local municipalities, which eliminated the need to acquire expensive private land, but reclaimed parts of Tokyo Bay, as well as rivers and canals. The resulting alignment removed a number of fishing and aquatic farming operations, and local fishing cooperatives had their licences revoked by the Tokyo Metropolitan Government. Among them was a seaweed harvesting field in Ōta Ward that had produced a premium brand of nori since the Edo period called Omori no nori.

The Ministry of Transport authorized the monorail project in December 1961. A groundbreaking ceremony was held on 1 May 1963, and the subsequent construction of the line progressed rapidly. Hitachi built the first-generation cars in Japan under license of Alweg (through the Hitachi–Alweg joint venture). Upon its inauguration, the Tokyo Monorail became the world's first commercial monorail service and Japan's first airport rail connection.

Service commenced on 17 September 1964, 23 days ahead of the Olympic opening ceremony on 10 October. Most of the artificial islands in Tokyo Bay had not yet been reclaimed, and the line mostly ran over water. It was notably cheaper to take a taxi with four people to the airport than to ride the monorail. A recession following the Olympics resulted in a decrease in airport arrivals, which severely affected ridership.

Infill stations and later expansions

Ōi Keibajō Mae became the monorail's first infill station upon its completion in May 1965. It was originally built as a temporary station above the water along the coast and only operated on days when an event was taking place at Ohi Racecourse. Its permanent replacement opened two years later. In November 1967, an overpass connecting the monorail platform to the JR platforms of Hamamatsuchō Station was completed. Between 1967 and 1993, four more stations were built along the original alignment; these were Haneda Seibijō, later renamed Seibijō (1967); Shin Heiwajima, later renamed Ryūtsū Center (1969); Shōwajima (1985); and Tennōzu Isle (1992).

When the monorail began operating, the passenger terminal at Haneda Airport was located on the west side of the airfield, south of Seibijō, and this was the southern end of the line. Upon the opening of a new passenger terminal—now Terminal 1—in 1993, the monorail was extended to a new platform and another station, Shin Seibijō, was built for the employees of nearby maintenance facilities. Meanwhile, the former airport passenger terminal was razed and the monorail tunnel beneath it abandoned to make room for an extension of Runway B. The original Haneda Station, which was abandoned along with the tunnel, was rebuilt farther west along the new section of tracks and renamed Tenkūbashi Station in November 1998. Although the rails were removed and its entrance walled off, the now-unused tunnel remains otherwise intact today below the Runway B extension.

The monorail has continued to adapt and expand with the terminal changes and expansions of Haneda Airport. A single-station,  extension to the airport's then new Terminal 2 opened on 1 December 2004, and resulted in the renaming of the existing Haneda Airport Station to Haneda Airport Terminal 1 Station. The opening of a passing loop at Shōwajima allowed for the operation of express services from 18 March 2007. A new infill station to serve the airport's new International Terminal opened on 21 October 2010. On 14 March 2020, the three stations serving Haneda Airport were renamed to coincide with the renaming of the International Terminal to Terminal 3.

Planned extension to Tokyo Station
In June 2009, Tokyo Monorail Co., Ltd., formally notified the Ministry of Land, Infrastructure and Transport of its intent to convert the present single-track terminal at Hamamatsucho, which had rested unchanged since 1964, into a dual-track, dual-platform structure.
However, in 2021 JR East has announced the construction of the Haneda Airport Access Line which will connect Tokyo Station with conventional rail.

New terminus at Hamamatsucho Station
As part of a redevelopment of the "World Trade Centre" a new monorail station will be built at Hamamatsucho Station.  It is scheduled to be completed by 2027.

Route

From its northern terminus at Monorail Hamamatsuchō Station, the line travels southbound as it crosses over the Yamanote, Keihin–Tōhoku, Ueno–Tokyo, Tōkaidō Main, and Tokaido Shinkansen lines. Upon entering Shibaura, it follows the edge of canals surrounded by artificial islands. On an artificial island within  just east of Shinagawa Station and the main campus of Tokyo University of Marine Science and Technology, the monorail starts to follow the Shuto Expressway Haneda Route alignment with a stop at Tennōzu Isle.

Service patterns

The following three service types operate on the line:
  
  
  

Tokyo Monorail trains operate on an average headway of four minutes. This can be as short as three minutes and 20 seconds during peak hours. "Local" trains stop at every station, with end-to-end travel taking 24 minutes. "Rapid" trains bypass the Shōwajima, Seibijō, Tenkūbashi, Shin Seibijō stations, and take 21 minutes to travel across the line. "Haneda Express" trains make non-stop runs between Monorail Hamamatsuchō Station and Haneda Airport; these trains arrive at Haneda Airport Terminal 3 in 13 minutes, Haneda Airport Terminal 1 in 16 minutes, and Haneda Airport Terminal 2 in 18 minutes. The Tokyo Monorail started operating  trains in December 2001, which departed from Haneda Airport at 11:50 pm; these trains began running all day three years later. In March 2007, the monorail replaced its original "Rapid" service with the two existing "Haneda Express" and "Rapid" service patterns.

Stations

Rolling stock
All rolling stock that has ever been operated in the Tokyo Monorail since inauguration are built by Hitachi Rail. , the Tokyo Monorail operates three train types: 1000 series, 2000 series, and most recently, 10000 series. Each car has a combination of aisle-facing bench seats, forward and rear-facing seats, and seats in the center of the aisle. The latter is because the train floor is lower than the diameter of the load bearing wheels above the top of the beam, unlike trains built for newer Japanese Alweg monorails. The trains also feature extra space for hand luggage, as a convenience for air travelers. These trains are stored and maintained at Shōwajima Depot beside Shōwajima Station during off-service hours. The 1000 series trains were introduced from 1989, and the 2000 series trains were introduced from 1997.

From 18 July 2014, the first of a fleet of new 10000 series 6-car trains was introduced, replacing the older 1000 series trains.

Former rolling stock
Former rolling stock once used on Tokyo Monorail include the 100/200/300/350 series (from 1964 until 1978), 500 series (from 1969 until 1991), 600 series (from 1977 until 1997), and 700/800 series (from 1982 until 1998).

Service

The Tokyo Monorail operates from around 5:00 a.m. to midnight with over 500 trains. The first departure towards the airport leaves at 04:58 and the last departure is at 00:01. Towards Hamamatsuchō, the first departure is at 05:11 and the final departure is at 00:05 (final departure serving all stations at 23:38). Passengers using the monorail to travel to the airport can take advantage of check-in facilities at Hamamatsuchō. Japan's domestic airlines (JAL, ANA, Skymark Airlines, and Air Do) have check-in counters and ticket machines right at the station. It carried its 1.5 billionth passenger on January 24, 2007.

An alternative to the monorail is the Keikyu Airport Line between the airport and Shinagawa Station. Both railways compete with bus services.

Ownership

In 1967, the Tokyo Monorail Co., Ltd. merged with Hitachi Transport Co., Ltd. and Western Hitachi Transport Co., Ltd. to form Hitachi Transport Tokyo Monorail Co., Ltd. after Hitachi Transport System acquired an 81-percent share of the company. The company re-established as the Tokyo Monorail Co., Ltd. in 1981.

Operation and maintenance

The , located next to Shōwajima Station, is the operations and maintenance center of the Tokyo Monorail. The complex houses an operations control room that controls the movement of trains, a power control room that controls the line's power supply, a vehicle maintenance and storage depot where cars are inspected and serviced, a track and trolley inspection and maintenance depot, and a crew depot.

Fares

, the Tokyo Monorail offers multiple fare types with varying lengths of validity and terms of use. One-way tickets, which are valid for the day of purchase, may be used to travel between two stations without making intermediate stops. Return tickets are similar but allow for a return trip; these are valid if returning to any Haneda Airport station within 10 days and to other stations within two weeks. Multiple-trip tickets are sold in books of 11 and are valid for two to three months. The purchase of "school commutation" multiple-trip tickets requires proof of a student discount certificate with the Open University of Japan. Groups of 15 or more can acquire discounted group tickets. A special discount ticket is offered to riders needing to transfer to the Yamanote Line. Commuter and travel passes are also available. The Tokyo Monorail began accepting the contactless smart card Suica on 21 April 2002. It began issuing its own "Monorail Suica" cards in 2009. The monorail also accepts the regional Pasmo card and the Japan Rail Pass.

Fares may be purchased from ticket vending machines at any monorail station. , Tokyo Monorail tickets can also be purchased from machines at the following airports: Fukuoka Airport, Hakodate Airport, Hiroshima Airport, Itami and Kansai airports in Osaka, Kagoshima Airport, Kumamoto Airport, Nagasaki Airport, Naha Airport, New Chitose Airport in Sapporo, Oita Airport, Okayama Airport, Takamatsu Airport, and Toyama Airport.

See also

Monorails in Japan

References

Further reading
 L.W. Demery, R. Forty, R. DeGroote and J.W. Higgins, Electric Railways of Japan (Interurbans- Tramways-Metros) Vol.1: Tokyo and Northern Japan. Light Rail Transit Association, 1983.

External links

 Official site

Tokyo Monorail
1964 establishments in Japan
Airport rail links in Japan
Alweg people movers
Haneda Airport
Rail transport in Tokyo
Railway lines opened in 1964
Monorails